The Garfield Thomas Water Tunnel is one of the U.S. Navy's principal experimental hydrodynamic research facilities and is operated by the Penn State Applied Research Laboratory. The facility was completed and entered operation in 1949. The facility is named after Lieutenant W. Garfield Thomas Jr., a Penn State journalism graduate who was killed in World War II. For a long time, the Garfield Thomas Water Tunnel was the largest circulating water tunnel in the world. It has been declared a historic mechanical engineering landmark by the American Society of Mechanical Engineers.

Today, in addition to many of its Navy projects, the facility tunnel-based research has expanded into pumps for the Space Shuttle, advanced propulsors for ships, heating and cooling systems, artificial heart valves, vacuum cleaner fans, and other pump and propulsor related products.

History
After the end of WW II, the US military started investing heavily in higher education nationwide. At the same time, Harvard terminated its Underwater Sound Laboratory (USL) which invented the first acoustical homing torpedo (FIDO); consequently Penn State hired Eric Walker, USL's assistant director to head its electrical engineering department, and the Navy transferred USL's torpedo division to Penn State - where it became the Ordnance Research Laboratory (ORL). The ORL eventually became the Applied Research Laboratory.

The Garfield Thomas Water Tunnel was built at Penn State in cooperation with ORL by the ARL for further torpedo research. Construction completed on October 7, 1949, and began operating six months later. Since then, the facility has expanded into viscosity, sound, wave, and wind research.

In 1992, the facility underwent a complete overhaul.

Capabilities

The facility consists of a number of closed circuit, closed jet and open jet facilities.

Water Tunnels
The facility operates four water tunnels.

Garfield Thomas Water Tunnel
The Garfield Thomas Water Tunnel is the facility's largest water tunnel. The 100 feet long, 32 feet high, 100,000 gallons tunnel is a closed-circuit, closed-jet. The system is powered by 1,491 kW (2,000-hp) pump, with a 4-blade adjustable pitch impeller and can produce a maximum water velocity of 18.29 m/s (40.91 mph). The system is capable of producing pressures between 413.7 and 20.7 kPa.

The tunnel is equipped with an array of instruments including: Propeller dynamometers, Five-hole pressure probe, Pitot probes, lasers, pressure sensors, hydrophones, planar motion mechanism (PMM), force balances, accelerometers, and acoustics arrays.

Smaller Water Tunnels
The facility operates two additional smaller water tunnels with diameters of 12 inches and 6 inches. Both are closed-circuit, closed-jet. The 12-incher is a 150 horsepower (111.8 kW) system capable of producing maximum water velocity of 24.38 m/s (54.53 mph). The 6-incher is a 25 hp (18.64 kW) system that can deliver a max velocity of 21.34 m/s (47.74 mph).

Both tunnels are equipped with lasers, pressure sensors, pressure transducers, and hydrophones

Ultra-High Speed Cavitation Tunnel
The facility also has a 1.5 inch closed-circuit, closed-jet cavitation tunnel capable of producing a maximum velocity of 83.8 m/s (187 mph). The stainless steel, 75 hp (55.9 kW) tunnel supports pressures as high as 41.4 kPa and temperatures of 16 °C to 176 °C.

Other facilities

In addition to the water tunnels, the facility operates an array of wind tunnels, glycerin tunnels, and anechoic chamber for used in many physics problems. The Boundary Layer Research Facility (BLRF) operates a 12-inch turbulent pipe flow of glycerine. Additionally, the facility operates a 20 hp (14.91 kW), open-jet, 1,750 rpm Axial-Flow Fan with a 36.58 m/s (81.83 mph) maximum velocity used for basic engineering research in turbomachinery blading. Another 2.75 meter diameter, 100 hp (74.6 kW) closed-circuit used specifically for research in viscous sublayer and in modeling of turbulent flow of fluids next to a wall at large scale.

See also 
 Pennsylvania State University Applied Research Laboratory
 Water tunnel (hydrodynamic)
 Ship model basin
 Pennsylvania State University
 List of historic mechanical engineering landmarks

References

External links

ARL Homepage

Ship design
Model boats
Pennsylvania State University campus
United States Navy installations
1949 establishments in the United States
1949 establishments in Pennsylvania
Landmarks in Pennsylvania